General Organization of Remote Sensing, (GORS) is a Syrian space research agency established in 1986. Headquartered in Damascus, GORS is responsible for carrying out aerospace and land surveying using remote sensing techniques. In 2018, the agency assisted the Food and Agriculture Organization of the United Nations in assessing the impacts of its irrigation projects on the production of crops such as wheat and barley in Syria.

See also 
 Syrian Space Agency

References

External links 
 

Space agencies
Government agencies established in 1986
Government of Syria
Science and technology in Syria